"Reencuentro", also known as "Patria Querida", is a song performed by Salvadoran singer-songwriter Álvaro Torres featuring Puerto Rican-Colombian band Barrio Boyzz. It was produced by Álvaro Torres and Víctor Torres, recorded in 1994 in Entourage Studios, North Hollywood, CA, and released on Torres' album Reencuentro in 1995. The song samples the traditional Central America melody of the "Torito Pinto dance". "Reencuentro" is a patriotic song, manifesting the impediment for distance and the yearning to return to the country where the subject belongs. 

In April 1995, the song was a success in Latin America and the United States, reaching the position 11 on the Billboard Hot Latin Tracks chart and number 3 in the Latin Pop Airplay chart. The music video was nominated in Lo Nuestro Awards in the category "Video of the year". It was recognized as one of the best-performing songs of the year at the 1996 BMI Latin Awards.
"Reencuentro" was also included in the 1996 album Voces Unidas, a project made for the Olympic Games "Atlanta 1996".

Composition and lyrics 
"Reencuentro" was written and composed by Álvaro Torres, being described as a mid-tempo pop ballad. The song is composed in the key of C major and follows the chord progression of C–Em–F–Am–Dm–G7–Em–Am–G–C–F–Dm–G7 in the verses, while in the chorus changes to C–Em–Dm–G7–F–G–F–Dm–G7.

Torres said "[it's] a song I wrote for my beloved homeland, El Salvador, but at the same time, it has the advantage that [...] every immigrant [can] make it theirs, because it is the sentiment proper of an immigrant". 

The song begins with the traditional melody of the "Torito Pinto dance" performed with a flute. In the first verse Torres's voice is heard accompanied by background stringed instruments; then comes the drums and the voices of Barrio Boyzz, which remain throughout the rest of the verse until the chorus. In the second verse, Torres's voice returns, keeping only his voice until the choir, then entering Barrio Boyzz repeating the chorus until the end of the song.

"Reencuentro" talks about nostalgia and the joy of meeting again in the country where it comes from, also recognizing the suffering that the country has passed through the years, due to wars and violence.

Music video 
The music video for "Reencuentro" was recorded in San Miguel de Allende, Guanajuato, Mexico, along with Barrio Boyzz. The clip begins showing settlers of an old town and children playing, then Torres is shown singing the beginning of the song. Then, Barrio Boyzz appears performing the song, while exchanging images of old people, children playing, violists, a room with candles, and people holding crosses. Finally, Barrio Boyzz and Torres sing together the song along with all the villagers.

In 1995, the music video was nominated in Lo Nuestro Awards in the category "Video of the Year", but lost to Luis Miguel's "La Media Vuelta".

Personnel 
Credits adapted from Reencuentro liner notes.

Vocals

 Álvaro Torres – lead vocals
 Barrio Boyzz – lead vocals (track 1)

Musicians

 César Benítez – keyboards, piano, sequencing
 Steve Durnin – french horn
 Cesar Espinoza – congas, güiro, tambouras
 Phillip D. Feather – oboe
 Ramon Flores – trumpet
 Grant Geissman – acoustic guitar, electric guitar
 Matt Germaine – saxophones
 Marty Jabara – percussion, timpani
 Eric Jorgensen – trombone
 John Jorgenson – mandoline
 Peter Kent – concert master
 Tony Lujan – trumpet
 John Schreiner – piano
 Amy Shulman – harp
 Joe Stone – oboe
 David Stout – trombone
 Roberto Vally – bass guitar
 John Yoakum – tenor saxophone

Production

 Álvaro Torres – production
 Victor Sanchez  – production, mixing
 Teresa Caffin – production assistance, engineering assistance
 Cappy Japngie – engineering assistance
 Terri Wong – engineering assistance

Recording

 Recorded at Entourage Studios, North Hollywood, CA

Charts

References 

1995 singles
Álvaro Torres songs
Barrio Boyzz songs